Cecil Grant was the founder of St George's School, Harpenden. Originally, a headmaster at Keswick School in Cumbria, Grant moved to Harpenden to establish the school in 1907.

He died on 3 April 1946, and left a sum of £6,833.53 to form a trust for the school.

References

19th-century births
20th-century deaths